LaTonya Swann (born February 4, 1991) is an American dancer, choreographer, print model, philanthropist, and the first winner of BET's Born to Dance (TV series): Laurieann Gibson.

Life and career 

LaTonya Swann was raised in District Heights, Maryland and graduated from Dr. Henry A. Wise, Jr. High School in 2009. She was a member of the Jr Washington Redskins All Star Dance Team, and Capitol Movement Faculty and Alumni, training in hip hop, jazz, ballet, and contemporary. After winning the $50,000 prize on Born to Dance in 2011 Swann moved to Los Angeles and working bicoastally, opened a large scale dance studio in Capitol Heights, Maryland which shares the name of her "Seize The Dance" chest tattoo. Swann has worked as a dancer and/or actress with Lady Gaga, Dawn Richard, Cassie, Shakira, Enrique Iglesias, Lil Mama, Aloe Blacc, Beyoncé, Cher Lloyd, Avenged Sevenfold, Memphis May Fire, Pharrell Williams, Alicia Keys, Tinie Tempah, Jonas Åkerlund, Gil Green, Colin Tilley, Rich Lee, Joe Dante, Matt Alonzo, Jon Jon Augustavo, Melina Matsoukas, and So Me. She has worked as a choreographer on television, tours, music videos, and stage plays including 106 and Park, WDCW and Royal The Stage Play written and directed by Chris Clanton. She has been a celebrity judge and instructor for University of Wisconsin–Madison Move If You Want It Dance Competition, and celebrity guest instructor for Get Kids Movin National Kids Fitness Convention.

Born To Dance 

Swann first appeared on the debut of Born To Dance: Laurieann Gibson August 2, 2011 at 10pm ET bringing in 1.2 million viewers. The show was produced by Laurieann Gibson and The Ted & Perry Company and included an appearance of Lady Gaga with her Monster Ball Tour Performance being the final show challenge.

"Born to dance" episodes

Career credits

Television 

2010: So You Think You Can Dance (U.S. season 7) - Vegas Week Contestant; Adechike Ballroom Partner
2011: 106 & Park - Guest with Laurieann Gibson & Born To Dance Top 3
2011: The Mo'Nique Show - Guest Dancer
2011: Born to Dance (TV series) - Contestant; Winner
2011: Shakira Latin Grammy Awards of 2011 Performance - Dancer
2012: Shake It Up (season 3) - Spirit Squad Member
2013: WDCW Young & The Throne (QC Show Segment) - Actress, "Imani"
2013: WDCW Queen Charis Show - Choreographer
2013: The Graham Norton Show - Dancer, Lady Gaga "Venus" Performance
2013: The X Factor (UK TV series) - Dancer, Lady Gaga "Venus" Performance

Film 

2014 : Warriors Fan Trailer (Ram Bhat) - Principle, Lizzies

Choreography and appearances 

2003-2008: Capitol Movement Annual Dance Concert DC - Dancer, Choreographer
2012: Cassie "King of Hearts" Performance 106 & Park - Assistant Choreographer, Dancer
2013: Get Kids Movin Fitness Convention - Guest Instructor
2013: University of Wisconsin–Madison Move If You Want It Competition - Celebrity Judge & Instructor
2014: Royal The Stage Play (Chris Clanton) - Choreographer

References

External links 
 

1991 births
Living people
People from District Heights, Maryland